This article lists the performances of each of the 58 national teams which have made at least one appearance in the IHF World Men's Handball Championship finals.

Debut of teams

* Successor Teams

** Composed of players from both South Korea and North Korea. The team split into two again after the tournament.

*** Due to not having the minimum amount of players needed, they did not play a single game. Their debut game was in the 2023 tournament.

Participation details
Legend
 – Champions
 – Runners-up
 – Third place
 – Fourth place
5th – Fifth place
6th – Sixth place
7th – Seventh place
8th – Eighth place
9th – Ninth place
10th – Tenth place
11th – Eleventh place
12th to 24th – Twelfth to twenty-fourth place
Q — Qualified for upcoming tournament
 — Qualified but withdrew
 — Did not qualify
 — Did not enter / Withdrew from the World Championship / Banned
 — Hosts

Results of host nations

Results of defending champions

References

World Handball Championship tournaments